Kenema is the third largest city in Sierra Leone (after Freetown and Bo), and the largest city in the country's Eastern Province. It is the capital of Kenema District and a major economic center of the Eastern Province. At the 2015 national census, Kenema had a  population of 200,354.

Kenema is one of Sierra Leone's most ethnically diverse cities. Like most parts of Sierra Leone, the Krio language of the Sierra Leone Creole people is by far the most widely spoken language in Kenema.

Kenema is governed by a directly elected city council, headed by a mayor in whom executive authority is vested, and who is responsible for the city's general management. The mayor and council members are elected every four years. Kenema's current mayor is Thomas Karimu Baio of the Sierra Leone People's Party. Karimu Baio was elected mayor with 79.4% of the vote in the 2018 Kenema Mayoral election . Kenema is an overwhelming  political stronghold of the Sierra Leone People's Party, the current national ruling party in Sierra Leone.

As in the rest of Sierra Leone, football is by far the city's most popular sport. The Kamboi Eagles, a professional football club based in Kenema, represents the city in the Sierra Leone National Premier League.

Kenema is known as the hometown of some of Sierra Leone's greatest international soccer stars, including the country's most widely known athlete, retired soccer star Mohamed Kallon. Other notable Sierra Leonean international footballers from Kenema include the country's current top striker, Kei Kamara, and retired soccer stars Paul Kpaka, Kemokai Kallon and Musa Kallon.

Kenema's growth was originally promoted by the logging and carpentry industries, which were linked to the city by the now-closed railway. Since then, its economy has benefited from the diamond mines first discovered in the area in 1931.

2014 Ebola outbreak
Kenema was the origin and first place in Sierra Leone to report Ebola.

Government
The city of Kenema is one of Sierra Leone's six municipalities and is governed with a city council form of government, which is headed by a mayor, in whom executive authority is vested. The mayor is responsible for the general management of the city. The mayor is elected directly by the residents of Kenema in a municipal elections held every four years. The current mayor of Kenema is Joseph Samba Keifala, a member of the Sierra Leone People's Party (SLPP), who won the 2012 Kenema Mayorship election with 74.99%, defeating his main opponent Ishmail Sesay of the APC, who took 19.36%. Kenema is a political stronghold of the SLPP party, the main opposition party in Sierra Leone.

In Presidential elections, Kenema has voted for the Sierra Leone People's Party by a vast majority of over 70%.

Demographics 
Kenema is the third largest city in Sierra Leone. one of the most ethnically diverse cities in Sierra Leone. The city is home to all of the country's ethnic groups, though the Mende people make up the largest ethnic group.

Education
As in the rest of Sierra Leone, Kenema has an education system with six years of primary school (Class 1-6), and six years of secondary school (Form 6-12); secondary schools are further divided into Junior secondary school (Form 1-3) and Senior secondary school (Form 4-6). Primary schools usually start from ages 6 to 12, and secondary schools usually start from ages 13 to 18. Primary Education is free and compulsory in government-sponsored public schools.
Prominent schools in Kenema include the Kenema Government Secondary School (GSSK),  Holy Trinity Secondary School, Ahmadiyya Secondary School, Holy Rosary Secondary School, Islamic Secondary School, and the Kamboi Lebanese International School.

The Eastern Technical University (ETU)  situated at the main Combema Road is the highest learning institution in the city, offering certificates and degree courses.

Health 
Kenema and Bo are endemic areas for a highly contagious tropical hemorrhagic fever known as Lassa fever. The Kenema Government Hospital is the centre of an international effort to combat the disease with support from the World Health Organization (WHO) and UNAMSIL.  New laboratories to improve rapid diagnosis are being installed at the hospital, which admits between 250 and 500 suspected cases per year.

In 2020, the World Health Organization secured a €500,000 grant from the German Corporation for International Cooperation to increase COVID-19 testing capacity in Sierra Leone, which was already taking place at the Kenema Government Hospital. Response to COVID-19 at the hospital is challenging, because of shortfalls in protective gear for workers and due to labor strikes by hospital workers who have not received salary.

Transportation 
Local car taxis, tricycles (Kekeh), and motor bike taxis called Okada.
The city is served by the Kenema Airport.

Sport 
As in the rest of the country, football is by far the most popular sport in Kenema. The city's most popular football club is the Kamboi Eagles which plays in the Sierra Leone National Premier League, the top football league in country.

Media 
The five main radio stations in Kenema are Eastern Radio 101.9, Radio Nongowa - SPIN FM 101.3, City Radio 103.3, Starline Radio 98.4 and  Sierra Leone's national radio and television stations, SLBS TV, and SLBS Radio are on the air in Kenema.  The BBC World Service, CNN International, and several other international stations are on the air in Kenema on satellite only.

Notable people 
 Mohamed Kallon, football star
Emmerson, musician
 Professor David John Francis, Chief Minister of the Republic of Sierra Leone 
Evans Brima Gbemeh, mayor
 Paul Kpaka, football star
Alpha Lansana, football star
 Kei Kamara, football star
 Brima Sesay, football star
 Kemokai Kallon, football star
 Musa Kallon, football manager
 Dr Salia Jusu-Sheriff, former vice president of Sierra Leone and first West African chartered accountant 
 J. B. Dauda,  a former Sierra Leonean politician
 Amadou Bakayoko, professional footballer, formerly with United Kingdom Championship Coventry City, now playing as striker with EFL League One team Forest Green Rovers and playing for Sierra Leone national team

Gallery

References

External links 

 The Kenema District Association

 
Populated places in Sierra Leone
Eastern Province, Sierra Leone